The A666 is a major road in Greater Manchester and Lancashire, England.

Route

The road runs from its junction with the A6, and A580 at the Irlams o' th' Height boundary with Pendlebury near Manchester, through Pendlebury, Clifton, Kearsley, Farnworth, Bolton, Darwen and Blackburn before meeting the A59 at Langho. Along the route are the West Pennine Moors, the Turton and Entwistle reservoir and the Entwistle reservoir forest.

Road names

Most common names
The road is mostly known as Manchester Road, Bolton Road, or Blackburn Road, depending on which area it is in.

Devil's Highway
It is sometimes referred to as the Devil's Highway or the Devil's Road because of Biblical associations of its number 666, and its high accident rate on the moors between Egerton and Darwen.

St Peter's Way
Officially, a short length from the A666(M) motorway and bypassing Farnworth to central Bolton is called St. Peter's Way.

Crash rate
Because of a crash rate that was three times higher than motorways in the borough, with 26 vehicle collisions and crashes a year and 40 people injured, road works and other changes were introduced, including the speed limit changed from 70 mph to 50 mph, speed cameras, better safety fencing, banning cyclists from the road, and slip road changes. Finished at the start of 2000, these reduced road accidents by 60%.

See also
 List of highways numbered 666

References

External links

SABRE A666 page

6-0666
6-0666
6-0666